The Raggedy Rawney is a 1988 British drama film starring Bob Hoskins, Dexter Fletcher, Zoe Nathenson, and Zoë Wanamaker. The story is about a young army deserter (Fletcher) in an unspecified time and country, who disguises himself as a madwoman and joins a nomadic gypsy caravan. The film involves the themes of  the destruction and futility of war, the culture of the Romani people, and the bonds generated by love and family. The film was also co-written and directed by Bob Hoskins. Musician Ian Dury has a small role as a character named Weazel. The movie marked Hoskins' debut as a director.

The film  was screened in the Un Certain Regard section at the 1988 Cannes Film Festival.

Plot
The film centres around the character of Tom, a young army recruit in an unnamed time and country (presumably World War II-era Eastern Europe) who deserts after an artillery barrage kills his sergeant, in the process blinding a sadistic officer who tries to stop him. He is shell-shocked into muteness and takes refuge with a travelling gypsy caravan, led by Darky (Hoskins). Among the principal members of the clan are Darky's mentally disabled son, Simon, Simon's mother Elle (Wanamaker) who harbours a grudge against Darky, and Darky's only daughter, Jessie (Nathenson), who forms a romantic bond with Tom, eventually becoming pregnant by him. In order to avoid arrest and execution by the army, Tom disguises himself as a "rawney", described in the film as a kind of "magic" madwoman, who (in the gypsy culture) is able to see the future and can control animals. Frightened at first, Darky befriends the "rawney", thinking him or her to be good luck, but soon Darky is revealed to be a flawed leader, unable to protect his clan from war, and beset by family turmoil which is exacerbated by Tom's presence. Throughout the film, the army and the partially blinded officer is a menace, threatening the gypsies' way of life and those who befriend them. In a moving finale, the army corners the gypsy clan, who manage to hold them off with meagre rifles and pistols long enough to enable the young members of the clan, including Tom and Jessie, to escape, at the cost of their own lives.

Cast
 Dexter Fletcher – Tom
 Zoë Nathenson – Jessie
 Zoë Wanamaker – Elle
 Bob Hoskins – Darky
 Ian McNeice – The Farmer
 Gawn Grainger – The Officer
 Jim Carter – The Soldier
 Veronica Clifford – The Farmer's Wife
 Rosemary Martin – Becky
 J. G. Devlin – Jake
 Ian Dury – Weazel
 Jane Wood – Vie
 Timmy Lang – Simon (as Timothy Lang)
 Jenny Platt – The Little Girl
 Jana Badurova – Farmer's Daughter

References

External links
 
 

1988 films
1988 drama films
Films directed by Bob Hoskins
Films scored by Michael Kamen
British drama films
Golan-Globus films
1988 directorial debut films
1980s English-language films
1980s British films